
Gmina Wasilków is an urban-rural gmina (administrative district) in Białystok County, Podlaskie Voivodeship, in north-eastern Poland.

The gmina contains part of the protected area called Knyszyń Forest Landscape Park.

Villages
Apart from the town of Wasilków, Gmina Wasilków contains the villages and settlements of Burczak, Dąbrówki, Horodnianka, Horodnianka-Kolonia, Jurowce, Jurowce-Kolonia, Katrynka, Katrynka-Leśniczówka, Mostek, Mostek-Gajówka, Nowodworce, Osowicze, Ożynnik, Podkrzemionka, Rybniki, Sielachowskie, Sochonie, Studzianki, Wólka Poduchowna, Wólka-Przedmieście, Woroszyły, Zapieczki and Zaścianek.

Neighbouring gminas
Gmina Wasilków is bordered by the city of Białystok and by the gminas of Czarna Białostocka, Dobrzyniewo Duże and Supraśl.

References
Polish official population figures 2006

Wasilkow
Białystok County